Francesca Romano (born 7 February 1971 in Rome) is a former female tennis player from Italy, who competed on the WTA Tour.  She reached a career-high ranking of #77 in August 1990 and reached the second round of the 1991 Australian Open.

ITF finals

Singles (3–2)

Doubles (2–1)

External links

1971 births
Italian female tennis players
Living people
Tennis players from Rome
Mediterranean Games silver medalists for Italy
Mediterranean Games bronze medalists for Italy
Mediterranean Games medalists in tennis
Competitors at the 1987 Mediterranean Games
Competitors at the 1991 Mediterranean Games